Marian Rizan (born 17 November 1969) is a retired Romanian artistic gymnast. He competed at the 1988 and 1992 Olympics with the best individual result of 9th place on the pommel horse in 1988. He placed third in this event at the 1987 European and fourth at the 1989 World Artistic Gymnastics Championships.

Rizan retired from competitions around 1991 to become a gymnastics coach and trained the Romanian national team from 1994 to 1996. After that he worked as a national coach in Denmark.

References

1966 births
Living people
Gymnasts at the 1988 Summer Olympics
Gymnasts at the 1992 Summer Olympics
Olympic gymnasts of Romania
Romanian male artistic gymnasts
Sportspeople from Craiova